Haitai (Hangul: 해태, Hanja: 海陀) is a South Korean company based in Seoul. Its main businesses are retail and instant foods, especially confectionery, beverage and ice cream.

The company was founded on October 3, 1945, and employs 3900 people at 8 plants in Cheonan, Anyang, Hayang, Gwangju, Cheongju, Munmak-eup, and Okcheon.

It was acquired by another Korean company, Crown Confectionery, in October 2004.

Products

Oh! Yes Choco Cake 
Oh! Yes Choco Cake (오예스) is a confectionery created by Haitai. Oh! Yes Choco Cakes are square cakes that come in a box. Each box contains a dozen cakes, each cake individually wrapped. The cake consists of a custard-like chocolate layer that is sandwiched between two white cake layers (sponge cake). The exterior of the cake is covered with chocolate and is decorated with a wavy drizzle of dark chocolate for the outer design. 

Oh! Yes Choco Cake is imported and distributed by :
 USA Haitai, Inc.
 Philippines Dynamex Inc.
 Canada Redfrog Enterprises Ltd.

Honey Series 
Haitai is responsible for catapulting the honey butter craze in South Korea. Starting in 2014, the company started with the Honey Butter Chip and successively released Honey Tong Tong, Honey Corn Pop, and other products. Many other food companies followed suit, releasing their own line of honey butter flavored snacks and confectionaries.

See also 

Economy of South Korea
Confectionery
Beverage
Ice Cream

References

External links 
 Haitai Confectionery & Foods Korean Company website
 Haitai htb Korean Company website
 Haitai English Company website
 Haitai Japanese Company website

Food and drink companies of South Korea
Confectionery companies of South Korea
Companies based in Seoul
Food and drink companies established in 1945
1945 establishments in Korea
South Korean brands